Kerubino Kuanyin Bol (1948 – 10 September 1999) was one of the founders of the Sudan People's Liberation Movement (SPLM) and one of the leaders of the Sudan People's Liberation Army (SPLA) during the Second Sudanese Civil War (1983-2005). He was said to have fired the first shot in that conflict, which flared up when the Khartoum government of Sudan imposed Islamic law, or Sharia, across the whole country, including the southern region which in 2011 became the Republic of South Sudan. The people in this region mainly follow  the Christianity and/or a traditional animist religion.

Early years

Bol was born in 1948 of Dinka parents in Twic County, Bahr al Ghazal province in the west of South Sudan. He was educated at a Roman Catholic mission primary school, and went on to intermediate studies.
In 1955 a battalion of southern soldiery mutinied, forming the nucleus of the Anyanya rebels in the First Sudanese Civil War, which continued until the south was granted regional autonomy under the Addis Ababa Agreement in 1972.
Bol joined the Anyanya and stayed on in the armed forces after the civil war ended.

SPLA commander

On 16th of May 1983 Bol and  William Nyuon Bany with their forces of battalion 105 fired the first bullet in Bor and founded the SPLA. In June 1983 Colonel John Garang de Mabior joined a mutiny of the garrison of Bor.  Kerubino then nominated Garang as the Commander-in-Chief, made himself  second in command, Bany third and Salva Kiir fourth. Bany was also the Chief of Staff, Arok Thon Arok, who was said to be related to Garang, was the fifth senior commander of the Permanent Political Military Office of the SPLA.

In 1986 Bol was deputy commander-in-chief of the SPLA and deputy chairman of the SPLM provisional executive committee. In 1987 he led a successful attack on several towns in Blue Nile province to the north of South Sudan. Growing over-ambitious, he was accused of plotting a coup against Garang and was jailed for the next six years.

SSIM commander

In August 1991 Riek Machar, Lam Akol and Gordon Kong announced that Garang had been ejected from the SPLM. They formed a rival militia called the SPLA-Nasir, after their base in the town of Nasir.

On 5 April 1993, at a press conference in Nairobi, three rebel factions – including  SPLA-Nasir (led by Lam Akol and joined by Machar and Bany)) – announced a coalition, to be called "Sudanese People's Liberation Army-United", known as SPLA-United. It included a number of former Garang officials and other southerners. Bol's Dinka forces made an important addition to the formerly Nuer-dominated SPLA-Nasir. Bol became deputy Commander in Chief. Although seeking independence for South Sudan, the group received covert support from the Government of Sudan as it fought the SPLA between 1991 and 1999 in attacks that became increasingly violent and ethnically motivated.

Government ally

Early in 1995 Machar dismissed Bol and Bany from his South Sudan Independence Movement (SSIM) on the basis that they had signed military and political agreements with the government of Sudan late in the previous year, and that they had attempted to form a government-supported faction in the SSIM.

The Sudan government tried to make Bol a leader in his home province, but he was not successful in gaining support of the local Dinka, and members of his militia returned to their villages.

In January 1998 Bol's forces briefly seized Wau, the main town in Bahr al Ghazal.
From this strong position, he applied to rejoin the SPLA. He was accepted but assigned to a headquarters position rather than a field appointment. In disgust, he returned to the Sudan Government and in 1999 joined the South Sudan United Army, a militia headed by Paulino Matip.

Death
Later in 1999, Commander Peter Gadet fell out with Paulino Matip. During the struggles that followed, Bol was shot in obscure circumstances on 10 September 1999. He left several wives and more than 20 children.

References

Sources

1948 births
1999 deaths
Dinka people
Second Sudanese Civil War
SPLM/SPLA Political-Military High Command